Edabaghine Mosque or mosque of the tanners is a Tunisian mosque in the Medina of Tunis.
It does not exist anymore.

Localization
The mosque was located in souk Edabaghine. It has now been replaced by new houses.

Etymology
It was named after the tanners, called Edabaghine in Arabic, who surrounded the mosque.

References

Mosques in Tunis